A date picker, popup calendar, date and time picker, or time picker is a graphical user interface widget which allows the user to select a date from a calendar and/or time from a time range. The typical practice is to provide a text box field which, when clicked upon to enter a date, pops up a calendar next to or below the field, allowing the user to populate the field with an appropriate date, or provides a text box with an icon of a calendar such that when the icon is clicked on, the calendar (or time field) appears, or show calendar widget directly (inline).

The date picker provides several advantages, including:
 allowing the user to enter a date by merely clicking on a date in the pop-up calendar as opposed to having to take their hand off the mouse to type in a date.
 validation of dates by restricting date ranges, e.g. only after today and for two weeks later, or only for dates in the past. 
 a date range can be entered such that for a set of "from-to" date fields, if the "from" field is filled, the "to" field cannot be set to a date before the "from" field, or if the "to" field is filled, the "from" field cannot be set to a later date than the "to" field.
 can have a "today" button 
 can customize the day the week begins on 
 Only legal dates can be entered, e.g. February 29, 2100 can't be entered, nor could June 31.
 Date format confusion is eliminated, e.g. is 7/4/10 July 4, 2010, April 7, 2010, or April 10, 2007?

In the case of a time picker, many similar functions are available, such as ensuring the user 
 Cannot enter an invalid time (25:18, 4:61).
 Cannot select an out of range time (6:00 pm for a business allowing customers to select their own appointments, but the business closes at 5:30), or during unattended times (like lunch).
 Cannot select an invalid range (can restrict selected time to the nearest 5, 10 or 15 minutes or any range, e.g. 2:30 or 2:45 is okay, but 2:37 is not.)

An example of a programmable date picker is shown in the documentation for the jQuery UI JavaScript user interface library at: http://jqueryui.com/datepicker/ 

Graphical control elements